David Wald is an American voice actor who voices in English dubs of Japanese anime. Some of his major roles include: Gajeel Redfox in Fairy Tail, Hannes in Attack on Titan, Bulat in Akame ga Kill!, and Master Chief in Halo Legends. He is involved in productions for Funimation and ADV Films (now Seraphim Digital and Sentai Filmworks) in Texas. He is openly gay and advocates bringing positive homosexual representation in dubbed anime. He served as ADR director for Sentai Filmworks dubs of Yuri/yaoi titles: Love Stage, Bloom Into You, Hitorijime My Hero, Kase-san and Morning Glories.

Filmography

Anime

Awards

References

External links
 
 David Wald at Crystal Acids English Voice Actor & Production Database
 

Living people
American male voice actors
Place of birth missing (living people)
University of Miami alumni
Funimation
American gay actors
Year of birth missing (living people)
Male actors from Miami
Male actors from Houston
21st-century American male actors
American voice directors
21st-century American LGBT people
Crunchyroll Anime Awards winners